Lake Perkollili is a ephemeral lake in the Goldfields-Esperance region of Western Australia.

Description
Lake Perkollili is a clay pan.

It was the location of racing of motorcycles and cars in the 1920s and 1930.
It was the location of Silver Wings races in the 1930s.
Despite the relocation of motor racing to other locations in Western Australia, the racing  at the lake bed was restarted in 2019, under the name of the Red Dust revival 2019 Lake Perkolilli.

See also

References

Lake Perkollili